The Studebaker Special Six was a car built by the Studebaker Corporation of South Bend, Indiana from 1918 to 1927.

While in production, the Special Six represented Studebaker's mid-range model. The car was available in a full array of body styles throughout its production.

Studebaker Special Six Commander
In 1927 the car was renamed the Studebaker Special Six Commander in preparation for the 1928 model year when the car would be henceforth known as the Studebaker Commander.

Standard Special Six Brougham specifications (1926 data)
Color - Studebaker blue with black upper structure
Seating Capacity – Five
Wheelbase - 
Wheels - Wood
Tires - 32” x 6.20” balloon
Service Brakes - contracting on rear
Emergency Brakes - contract on drum on rear of transmission
Engine  - Six-cylinder, vertical, cast en block, 3-1/2 x 5 inches; head removable; valves in side; H.P. 29.4 N.A.C.C. rating
Lubrication - Force-feed
Crankshaft - Four bearing
Radiator – Tubular
Cooling – Water Pump
Ignition – Storage Battery
Starting System – Two Unit
Voltage – Six to eight
Wiring System – Single
Gasoline System – Vacuum
Clutch – Dry plate, single disc
Transmission – Selective sliding
Gear Changes – 3 forward, 1 reverse
Drive – Spiral bevel
Rear Springs – Semi-elliptic
Rear Axle – Semi-floating
Steering Gear – Worm-and-wheel

Standard equipment
New car price included the following items:
tools
jack
speedometer
ammeter
electric horn
thief-proof lock
automatic windshield cleaner
demountable rims
stop light
inspection lamp and cord
spare tire carrier
rear-view mirror
sun visor
cowl ventilator
opalescent rear-quarter reading lamps
motometer
headlight dimmer
clock

Optional equipment
The following was available in new models at an extra cost:
Hydraulic four-wheel brakes with disc wheels
Spare wheel

Source:

References

External links

Special Six
Cars introduced in 1918
1920s cars